Erik Christensen (born December 17, 1983) is a Canadian former professional ice hockey centre who last played for HV71 of the Swedish Hockey League (SHL).

Playing career
Christensen was drafted by the Pittsburgh Penguins in the third round (69th overall) of the 2002 NHL Entry Draft. In the 2002–03 season, Christensen received the Bob Clarke Trophy for being the leading scorer of the Western Hockey League (WHL). He tallied 108 points (54 goals) in 67 games with the Kamloops Blazers.

The 2004–05 NHL lockout left the Wilkes-Barre/Scranton Penguins of the American Hockey League (AHL) stacked with talent, but Christensen impressed Penguins management by scoring 27 points (14 goals) in his first pro season. In the 2005–06 season, he jumped out of the gate quickly, tallying 19 points (9 goals) in only 9 games. The Pittsburgh Penguins called him up on October 31, 2005.

Christensen scored his first NHL goal on November 3, 2005, against the New York Islanders (against goaltender Rick DiPietro) at 15:43 into the 2nd period. Another promising rookie for the Penguins in 2005–06 (along with Sidney Crosby, Colby Armstrong, Ryan Whitney and others), Christensen earned 13 points (6 goals) in 33 games with the Penguins during his rookie campaign.

On February 26, 2008, the Atlanta Thrashers acquired Christensen along with Colby Armstrong, Angelo Esposito, and a first-round draft pick in a trade deadline deal that sent Marián Hossa and Pascal Dupuis to the Penguins.

On March 4, 2009, the Thrashers sent Christensen to the Anaheim Ducks in exchange for Eric O'Dell. He contributed 2 goals and 7 assists to the Ducks during the remainder of the season, and contributed 2 assists during the 2009 Stanley Cup Playoffs.

Christensen was claimed off waivers by the New York Rangers on December 2, 2009.

Christensen has been valuable in shootouts his entire career. As of the end of the 2009-2010 season, he had scored 23 goals in 43 attempts for a 53.5% success rate.

During a game against the New Jersey Devils on December 27, 2010, Christensen sustained an injury to his right knee ligament requiring him to miss four to six weeks.

On February 3, 2012, Christensen was traded by the Rangers, along with a conditional 7th round draft pick in 2013, to the Minnesota Wild for center Casey Wellman. The Wild received the conditional pick after Christensen was not re-signed by the team following the 2011-2012 season.

On June 5, 2012, Christensen signed a two-year agreement with Czech-based HC Lev Praha, of the Kontinental Hockey League. In the midst of his final year under contract with Lev, Christensen secured a mid-season transfer to the Swedish Hockey League, with HV71, on October 22, 2013. In his fourth and final season with HV71 in the 2016–17 season, Christensen contributed with 21 points in 45 games and notched a further 5 points in 16 post-season games to help HV71 capture their 5th Le Mat Trophy. A week after claiming the Championship, Christensen was not tendered a new contract with HV71 and became a free agent. He opted to end his 13-year professional career and return home to Edmonton.

Personal life
Christensen's nickname has been "Crusher" since he was 14 years old. He is the cousin of actor Hayden Christensen.

Career statistics

Awards and honors

References

External links

1983 births
Living people
Anaheim Ducks players
Atlanta Thrashers players
Brandon Wheat Kings players
Canadian ice hockey centres
Canadian people of Danish descent
HV71 players
Ice hockey people from Edmonton
Kamloops Blazers players
HC Lev Praha players
Manitoba Moose players
Minnesota Wild players
New York Rangers players
Pittsburgh Penguins draft picks
Pittsburgh Penguins players
Wilkes-Barre/Scranton Penguins players
Canadian expatriate ice hockey players in the Czech Republic
Canadian expatriate ice hockey players in Sweden
Canadian expatriate ice hockey players in the United States